"Life Story" is a song by American recording artist Angie Stone. It was written by Gerry DeVeaux and Craig Ross for Stone's debut studio album, Black Diamond (1999), while production was overseen by DeVeaux, featuring additional production from Cutfather & Joe. Released as the album's second international single, it peaked at number 22 on the UK Singles Chart, while reaching the Dutch and German Singles Charts.

Mixmag included the Booker T Vocal Mix of "Life Story" in their list of "16 of the Best Uplifting Vocal Garage Tracks".

Track listings

Charts

References

External links
 

1999 songs
2000 singles
Arista Records singles
Angie Stone songs
Songs written by Gerry DeVeaux
Songs written by Craig Ross
Song recordings produced by Cutfather